Kuivaniemi is a former municipality of Finland.

It was located in the province of Oulu and is part of the Northern Ostrobothnia region.

The municipality was unilingually Finnish.

Kuivaniemi was incorporated into Ii municipality on 1 January 2007. The formed municipality inherited Kuivaniemi's seal-sporting coat of arms.

References

External links 

Former municipalities of Finland
Populated places established in 1867
Populated places disestablished in 2007